The City of Commerce City is a home rule municipality located in Adams County, Colorado, United States. The city population was 62,418 at the 2020 United States Census, a 35.95% increase since the 2010 United States Census. Commerce City is the 18th most populous municipality in Colorado. Commerce City is located north of Denver and is a part of the Denver–Aurora–Lakewood, CO Metropolitan Statistical Area and the Front Range Urban Corridor. Dick's Sporting Goods Park, a soccer stadium in Commerce City, hosts the Colorado Rapids of Major League Soccer.

History
In 1859 after fighting in Bleeding Kansas, John D. "Colonel Jack" Henderson built a ranch, trading post, and hotel on Henderson Island in the South Platte River in Arapahoe County, Kansas Territory north of Denver, from which he sold meat and provisions to gold seekers on their way up the South Platte River Trail to the gold fields during the Pikes Peak Gold Rush. Henderson Island was the first permanent settlement in the South Platte River Valley between Fort Saint Vrain in the Nebraska Territory and the Cherry Creek Diggings in the Kansas Territory. Henderson Island is today the site of the Adams County Regional Park and Fairgrounds.

Among the first establishments in the modern Commerce City were cemeteries. Riverside Cemetery, founded in 1876, is located in the city's southwest corner at East 52nd Avenue and Brighton Boulevard. Rose Hill Cemetery, in the heart of historic Commerce City, was established in 1892 on what at the time was an open plain by the United Hebrew Cemetery Association.

The first school in the area began in 1871 as a one-room schoolhouse, with other schools added in 1899 and later in 1907. This latter school is now part of the North Building at the former site of Adams City High School, now Adams 14 School District Administration Buildings.

Several towns were founded in this part of Adams County in the 19th century. Derby, a Burlington Railroad station in 1887, was laid out as a town in 1889, although it was largely vacated by 1891. Irondale was first settled in 1889, named after a foundry that was opened that year. It was incorporated as the town of Irondale in 1924, but unincorporated in the 1930s due to increasing vacancy. Meanwhile, Adams City was laid out in 1903, with developers hoping the county seat would be established there; however, Brighton was elected county seat in 1904 and Adams City was vacated in 1922.

Until the late 1920s, the area was devoted to agriculture, including wheat fields, dairies, and pig farms. Industry moved in, with a refinery established in 1930 and grain elevators built in the late 1930s. Rocky Mountain Arsenal was founded in 1942 due east of the growing community.

In 1946 and 1947, Adams County School District 14 was formed from surrounding schools, and Adams City was redeveloped about that time. In 1951, as Denver was considering annexing the area, a plan to incorporate all of southern Adams County was developed. In July 1952, area residents voted 251 to 24 to incorporate Commerce Town, comprising neighborhoods such as Rose Hill and southern Adams City. Commerce Town annexed part of Derby in 1962, increasing the population over fourfold, enough for the town to gain the status of a city. The city name was duly changed to Commerce City.  In April 2007, the citizens of Commerce City voted more than 2:1 to retain their city's name.

The Mile High Kennel Club, a greyhound racing park founded in 1949, is no longer operational. With the onset of widespread off-track gambling, the physical moving of races around the country to different parks became unnecessary. The City of Commerce City has purchased the land with future development use unknown at this time.

A new Adams City High School has been constructed on land at 72nd and Quebec streets. This was formerly part of the Rocky Mountain Arsenal. The new school campus opened in 2009.

Geography
Commerce City is located at  (39.840735, -104.901139).

Climate

Demographics

As of the census of 2000, there were 20,991 people, 6,668 households, and 4,974 families residing in the city.  The population density was  under the age of 18, 11.5% from 18 to 24, 30.6% from 25 to 44, 18.1% from 45 to 64, and 9.2% who were 65 years of age or older.  The median age was 30 years. For every 100 females, there were 109.3 males.  For every 100 females age 18 and over, there were 111.1 males.

The racial makeup of the city was 74.15% White, 3.39% African American, 1.23% Native American, 2.46% Asian, 13.15% from other races, and 5.62% from two or more races. Hispanic or Latino of any race are 46.8% of the population.

The median income for a household in the city was $69,268 and the median wage in the city was $54,340. The labor force was 28,684 with 31,086 jobs residing within the city.  About 15.3% of families and 19.4% of the population were below the poverty line, including 22.5% of those under age 18 and 15.1% of those age 65 or over.

Industry
Over 1,400 companies call Commerce City home, ranging from international and national headquarters to small businesses and entrepreneurs.

Originally, this facility existed as two separately owned refineries, one on each side of Brighton Boulevard.

Suncor Energy bought the west refinery from ConocoPhillips in 2003. A project to upgrade this facility began in August of that year.

Suncor purchased the east refinery from Valero in June 2005 with the eventual goal of combining the two operations. As a result of a lawsuit by the U.S. Environmental Protection Agency (EPA) and a number of states (including Colorado) alleging violations of the Clean Air Act, Valero agreed in June 2005 to make pollution-reducing changes to its refineries, including the Commerce City facility.  Suncor's purchase agreement included an assumption of all liability from this suit.

The west refinery's upgrade project, named "Project Odyssey," was extended to the east refinery.  The west plant was shut down in February 2006 to complete the upgrade, while the east plant continued to refine  of oil per day. The completion of the $445 million project was announced in June 2006 and allows Suncor to meet the EPA's mandate to reduce the sulfur content of diesel fuel.  It also gives the refinery the ability to process Suncor's Canadian sour crude oil sands.  The combined facility is the largest refinery in the Rocky Mountain region.

Education
Adams County school districts 27J and 14 serve Commerce City.

Notable people
Notable individuals who were born in or have lived in Commerce City include:
 Ronnie Bradford (born 1970), football defensive back
 Dominick Moreno (born 1985), Colorado state legislator
 Joe Rogers (1964–2013), former Lieutenant Governor of Colorado
 JoAnn Windholz, Colorado state legislator

In popular culture
Denver-based band DeVotchKa recorded a song called "Commerce City Sister".

See also

Colorado
Bibliography of Colorado
Index of Colorado-related articles
Outline of Colorado
List of counties in Colorado
List of municipalities in Colorado
List of places in Colorado
List of statistical areas in Colorado
Front Range Urban Corridor
North Central Colorado Urban Area
Denver-Aurora, CO Combined Statistical Area
Denver-Aurora-Lakewood, CO Metropolitan Statistical Area
Rocky Mountain Arsenal National Wildlife Refuge

References

External links

City of Commerce City website
CDOT map of the City of Commerce City

 
Cities in Colorado
Cities in Adams County, Colorado
Denver metropolitan area
Populated places established in 1952
1952 establishments in Colorado